Lee Boo-yeol (born October 16, 1958) is a Korean football midfielder who played for South Korea in the 1984 Asian Cup. He also played for Kookmin Bank FC and Lucky Goldstar Hwangso.

International records

References

External links
 
 Lee Boo-yeol – National Team stats at KFA 
 

South Korean footballers
South Korea international footballers
Goyang KB Kookmin Bank FC players
FC Seoul players
K League 1 players
1958 births
Living people
Association football midfielders